Die Knowing is the fifth studio album by Canadian hardcore punk band Comeback Kid. It was released on March 4, 2014.

Track listing

Reception 

Die Knowing has been well received by critics. Writing for All About the Rock, Mark Booth said: "This is an album that is full of songs that all seem like they would be perfect live and maybe that is what Comeback Kid were looking at getting on record, some of the live intensity and boy have they accomplished that!".

Credits 
Comeback Kid
Andrew Neufeld – lead vocals, guitar
Jeremy Hiebert – lead guitar, backing vocals
Kyle Profeta – drums, percussion
Matt Keil – bass, backing vocals
Stu Ross – rhythm guitar, vocals

Guest musicians
 Poli Correia (Devil in Me) – vocals on "Losing Sleep"
 Scott Wade – vocals on "Full Swing"

Production
Dave Quiggle – artwork
Kyle Black – production, engineering, mixing

References 

Comeback Kid albums
2014 albums
Victory Records albums